Body Talk is the debut album by British soul/dance group Imagination, produced by Steve Jolley and Tony Swain and released in October 1981.  It is one of the earliest albums of its genre to have a distinctive 'British' sound as opposed to being an attempt to recreate contemporary American styles.

The title track was an immediate hit, reaching No. 4 on the UK singles chart. Two further singles, "In and Out of Love" and "Flashback", also reached the top 20. The album itself peaked at No. 20.

Body Talk proved to be an enduring album, with the tracks "So Good, So Right" and "Burnin' Up" being cited as influential and ahead of their time (the latter has been acknowledged by Frankie Knuckles as a key track in the development of house music).

Track listing 

All tracks composed by Steve Jolley, Tony Swain, Leee John, Ashley Ingram and Errol Kennedy

 "Body Talk" - 6:01  
 "So Good, So Right" - 6:58  
 "Burnin' Up" - 4:45  
 "Tell Me Do You Want My Love" - 5:27  
 "Flashback" - 4:30  
 "I'll Always Love You (But Don't Look Back)" - 3:54  
 "In and Out of Love" - 5:31
In July 1982, with the success of "Just an Illusion", the album was re-released in the US as an 8-track album, with the single version of "Just an Illusion" included as the fourth track.

Personnel
Musicians
Leee John – lead vocals, keyboards
Ashley Ingram – bass, vocals
Errol Kennedy – drums, percussion
Orphy Robinson – vibraphone on "In and Out of Love"
Tony Swain – additional keyboards
Steve Jolley – additional percussion
Technical
Tony Swain – engineer, producer, arrangement
Steve Jolley – engineer, producer, arrangement
Richard Lengyel – assistant engineer
Tony Bridge – cutting engineer
Morgan Khan – engineer, executive producer
Eliot Cohen – executive producer
Ellis Elias – executive producer
Terry Pastor – illustration
Chess Creative Services – design, artwork
John Ridley – photography

Charts

References

Imagination (band) albums
1981 debut albums
Albums produced by Jolley & Swain